Tun Sulaiman bin Ninam Shah (2 January 1920 – 5 July 2003) was a Malaysian businessman and veteran politician. He was also former member of Johore State Council for Muar Coastal (1954–1959) and Johor State Legislative Assembly for Parit Jawa (1959-1964), former Senator (1979-1985) and the 6th Deputy President of the Dewan Negara (1982-1985). He is one of the founders of United Malays National Organisation (UMNO) and former Permanent Chairman of UMNO (1976-2003).

Family
Sulaiman was born in Kampung Sarang Buaya, Muar, Johor to a mix of Indian Muslim and Malay family. He married Rose Othman in 1946 and the couple had nine children. Six sons and three daughters named, Datin Faridah, Datuk Kadar Shah, Mohd Shah, Othman, Zainal Abiddin, Mariam, Hassan, Mohd Nathir and Intaan Rogayah.

Early life
Sulaiman started his career as a police constable in Johor in 1939. Three years later when Malaya was under the Japanese occupation, he was promoted as the Police Vehicles Officer and later as the Assistant Superintendent of Police (ASP) to work as the Police Chief of Muar district until the surrender of Japan in 1945. At the same time, Sulaiman started to become involved in business by opening a newspapers, magazines and books store in Muar. Sulaiman in the subsequent year he managed to get a tender contract to provide foods supplies to Muar Hospital. In the 1970s, he started a joint-venture company opening a palm oil estate in Segamat.

Sulaiman later successfully got elected as the chairman and director for companies such as Budget Rent-A-Car, Laksamana Tour, Top Coach Builder, Malacca-Singapore Ekspress, Pelaburan Johor Bhd., T & T Properties, Menara Landmark and also Bank Rakyat.

Politics 
Sulaiman was involved in politics since the foundation of UMNO in 1946. In the 1st general election of Malaya in 1954 before Independence, he contested as an Alliance Party candidate and won the Muar Coastal seat to be a member of Johore State Council. In the second Malayan general election in 1959, he contested again under Alliance Party and managed to defeat the Pan-Malayan Islamic Party (PMIP) candidate with 7,020 majority votes to be the Johor state assemblyman for Parit Jawa seat. However, he had a heart condition which caused him to retract from re-contesting in 1964 general election

He maintained his position as Deputy Chairman of the Muar Division of UMNO until 1967. In the following year he was selected as the Permanent Chairman of UMNO Malaysia in 1976 before elected in 1978. He held the position until his death in 2003.

Sulaiman was also appointed as senator in Dewan Negara for two terms from 1979 to 1985 which he was elected as the Deputy President in the second term.

Death
Sulaiman, 83, died from leukaemia at 5am, at the Pantai Medical Centre, Kuala Lumpur. He was buried at 6th Mile Muslim Cemetery, Jalan Bakri, Bukit Bakri, Muar, Johor.

Honours

Honours of Malaysia
  : 
  Companion of the Order of the Defender of the Realm (JMN) (1976)
  Commander of the Order of Loyalty to the Crown of Malaysia (PSM) – Tan Sri (1984)
  Commander of the Order of the Defender of the Realm (PMN) – Tan Sri (1994)
  Grand Commander of the Order of Loyalty to the Crown of Malaysia (SSM) – Tun (2001)
  :
  Knight Grand Commander of the Order of the Crown of Johor (SPMJ) – Dato' (1970)
  Knight Grand Companion of the Order of Loyalty of Sultan Ismail of Johor (SSIJ) – Dato' (1976)
  Sultan Ibrahim Medal (PIS)
  Star of Sultan Ismail (BSI)

Places named after him
Several places were named after him, including:
 Sekolah Menengah Kebangsaan Tun Sulaiman Ninam Shah, Muar, Johor. (a secondary school formerly SMK Jalan Junid which rename in honour of Tun Sulaiman Ninam Shah)
 Taman Tun Sulaiman Ninam Shah (a housing area near Jalan Junid, Parit Sakai, Muar, Johor)
 Jalan Sulaiman Ninam Shah 1 - Jalan Sulaiman Ninam Shah 6 (streets of Taman Bunga Mawar, Muar, Johor)
 Dewan Tun Sulaiman Ninam Shah (a multi-purpose hall of Bangunan UMNO Muar, 123, Jalan Meriam, Taman Sri Tanjung, Muar, Johor)

References

1920 births
2003 deaths
People from Johor
People from Muar
Malaysian people of Malay descent
Malaysian people of Indian descent
Malaysian Muslims
20th-century Malaysian businesspeople
United Malays National Organisation politicians
Members of the Dewan Negara
Members of the Johor State Legislative Assembly
Grand Commanders of the Order of Loyalty to the Crown of Malaysia
Commanders of the Order of the Defender of the Realm
Commanders of the Order of Loyalty to the Crown of Malaysia
Knights Grand Commander of the Order of the Crown of Johor
Companions of the Order of the Defender of the Realm